Friday Ubi Etim (born 21 May 2002) is a Nigerian professional footballer who plays as a forward for Vizela.

Club career
A youth product of Dominion Hotspurs, Etim moved to Vizela U23s on 2 September 2021, signing until 2025. With the Vizela U23s he was named the top scorer for the 2021-22 Liga Revelação season. He made his professional debut with Vizela in a 3–1 Taça de Portugal loss to Porto on 12 January 2022. He was promoted to their Primeira Liga squa ahead of the 2022-23 season.

References

External links
 
 

2002 births
Living people
Sportspeople from Lagos
Nigerian footballers
Association football forwards
F.C. Vizela players
Primeira Liga players
Nigerian expatriate footballers
Expatriate footballers in Portugal
Nigerian expatriate sportspeople in Portugal